V337 Carinae (V337 Car, q Carinae) is a K-type bright giant star in the constellation of Carina.  It is an irregular variable and has an apparent visual magnitude which varies between 3.36 and 3.44.

V337 has a spectral class of K2.5II, indicating a bright giant. It is considered likely to be on the red giant branch of stars fusing hydrogen around an inert helium core.

V337 Carinae has two companions listed in multiple star catalogues. Component B is a distant background star, while component C is at about the same distance as V337 Carinae.

References

Carina (constellation)
Slow irregular variables
K-type bright giants
Carinae, q
089388
050371
Carinae, V337
CD-60 03010
4050